Stan Wawrinka defeated Roger Federer in the final, 4–6, 7–6(7–5), 6–2 to win the singles tennis title at the 2014 Monte-Carlo Masters. It was his first Masters 1000 title.

Novak Djokovic was the defending champion, but lost to Federer in the semifinals.

Seeds
The top eight seeds receive a bye into the second round.

  Rafael Nadal (quarterfinals)
  Novak Djokovic (semifinals)
  Stan Wawrinka (champion)
  Roger Federer  (final)
  Tomáš Berdych (third round)
  David Ferrer (semifinals)
  Richard Gasquet (withdrew because of a lumbar injury)
  Milos Raonic (quarterfinals)
  Jo-Wilfried Tsonga (quarterfinals)
  Fabio Fognini (third round)
  Tommy Robredo (third round)
  Grigor Dimitrov (third round)
  Mikhail Youzhny (first round)
  Kevin Anderson (first round)
  Nicolás Almagro (third round, withdrew because of a foot injury)
  Jerzy Janowicz (first round)
  Alexandr Dolgopolov (second round)

Draw

Finals

Top half

Section 1

Section 2

Bottom half

Section 3

Section 4

Qualifying

Seeds

 Denis Istomin (first round, retired)
 Mikhail Kukushkin (first round)
 Albert Montañés (qualified)
 Teymuraz Gabashvili (qualified)
 Carlos Berlocq (first round)
 Kenny de Schepper (first round)
 Pablo Carreño Busta (Qualifying competition, lucky loser)
 Marinko Matosevic (Qualifying competition, lucky loser)
 Michał Przysiężny (first round)
 Dušan Lajović (first round, retired)
 Aleksandr Nedovyesov (first round)
 Filippo Volandri (qualifying competition)
 Łukasz Kubot (qualifying competition)
 Stéphane Robert (qualifying competition)

Qualifiers

  David Goffin
  Paul-Henri Mathieu
  Albert Montañés
  Teymuraz Gabashvili
  Albert Ramos
  Michaël Llodra
  Evgeny Donskoy

Lucky losers

  Pablo Carreño Busta
  Marinko Matosevic

Qualifying draw

First qualifier

Second qualifier

Third qualifier

Fourth qualifier

Fifth qualifier

Sixth qualifier

Seventh qualifier

References

External links
 Main draw
 Qualifying draw

2014 Monte-Carlo Rolex Masters